Liardetia is a genus of land snails in the family Euconulidae, the hive snails.

Species include:
 Liardetia boninensis
 Liardetia doliolum
 Liardetia indifferens
 Liardetia samoensis
 Liardetia sculpta
 Liardetia tenuisculpta

References

External links
Hoong, H. W. (1995). A review of the land snail fauna of Singapore. The Raffles Bulletin Of Zoology 43(1): 91-113.

 
Euconulidae
Taxonomy articles created by Polbot